Smashing Time is a 1967 British satirical comedy film starring Rita Tushingham and Lynn Redgrave. It is a satire on the 1960s media-influenced phenomenon of Swinging London. It was written by George Melly and directed by Desmond Davis. The supporting cast includes Ian Carmichael, Michael York, Jeremy Lloyd, Anna Quayle, Irene Handl, Arthur Mullard, and Geoffrey Hughes.

Plot
Brenda (Rita Tushingham) and Yvonne (Lynn Redgrave), two girls from the North of England, arrive at St Pancras railway station in London to seek fame and fortune. However, their image of the city is quickly tarnished when they realise that they cannot pay for their meals in a greasy spoon café as Brenda has been robbed of her savings by a tramp. Yvonne visits Carnaby Street in the hope of catching the eye of a trendy photographer, Tom Wabe (Michael York), while Brenda has to stay behind and do the washing up. A messy scene ensues as washing-up liquid is mistaken for ketchup and everyone in the café is drenched in variously-coloured liquids.

Yvonne excitedly tells Brenda that Wabe took her photo for a newspaper and paid her for it. However, when the paper drops that day, Brenda sees Yvonne has been mocked for being out of fashion, and decides to confront Wabe. She finds him at a strange party served by robots (built and introduced by Clive Sword (Bruce Lacey)). In trying to curse him out, Tom attempts to charm her.

The girls get a referral from their new flatmate for hostess jobs at a night club. On their first night there, Yvonne is summoned by affluent Bobby Mome-Rath (Ian Carmichael), who gets her drunk and spirits her to an apartment he keeps for one-night stands. Brenda follows them, sneaks into the apartment, and tries to sabotage the tryst, adding laxative to Bobby's drink and ensuring that his bubble bath gets out of control. Meanwhile, Bobby's building super (David Lodge) spies through a hole in the ceiling. he falls through, giving Brenda and Yvonne a chance to escape. When they return to their flat, they learn the club has fired them.

Brenda is hired by Charlotte Brillig (Anna Quayle), a dilettante heiress, to manage her exclusive design shop called "Too Much," and is left in charge while her boss meets her ostensible main employee for lunch. When affluent hangers-on come into the shop, Brenda forces them to buy something. Although she sells a lot, Charlotte isn't pleased because nothing is left for rich customers to see. At the shop Brenda meets Tom, who asks her out to lunch. The restaurant, named Sweeny Todd's, is where Yvonne has found a job, serving pies in Nell Gwynne garb. A custard-pie fight starts at the party and spreads to the street. Yvonne is blamed for starting the pie fight and fired. In turn, when Brenda brings Yvonne to the shop, they learn Charlotte has capriciously shut the business down to go on an impulse trip to Greece, leaving both girls again out of work.

The girls watch a Candid Camera-style TV show on a television in a shop window entitled You Can't Help Laughing in which an old lady's house is demolished as a joke. When they walk back to their rooming house, they discover the program has also demolished their home as well. Yvonne, as the only name on the lease, wins a reimbursement cheque for £10,000. She decides to invest the prize money in becoming a pop star. Although the live recording of her single, "I'm So Young", is patently awful, it becomes highly polished after mixing, and Yvonne's out-of-tune voice is put in tune. It becomes a big hit and Yvonne becomes a star appearing on other programmes like Hi-Fi Court (a parody of Juke Box Jury).

Yvonne and Brenda drift apart. As Tom Wabe's new girlfriend, Brenda goes to dinner on his canal barge home and stays the night. They spend the next day taking photos and she goes on to become a top model, while Yvonne's popularity wanes. Yvonne throws a plate at the TV when she sees Brenda in an advert for a new perfume called "Direct Action".

At a glamorous and star-studded party for Yvonne at the top of the Post Office Tower, Yvonne sits alone while everyone else enjoys themselves. Brenda watches the party on CCTV and sees Tom arrive to be mobbed by adoring girls. She gatecrashes the party only to see Yvonne humiliated when she falls in her own giant cake. Brenda finds the control to the revolving restaurant and turns it to full speed, ending the party in disarray.

The girls walk away in the early morning and decide to return home. The film ends with a reprise of the song Smashing Time.

Cast
 Rita Tushingham as Brenda 
 Lynn Redgrave as Yvonne 
 Michael York as Tom Wabe 
 Anna Quayle as Charlotte Brillig 
 Irene Handl as Mrs. Gimble 
 Ian Carmichael as Bobby Mome-Rath 
 Jeremy Lloyd as Jeremy Tove 
 Toni Palmer as Toni 
 George A. Cooper as Irishman 
 Peter Jones as Dominic the game show host
 Arthur Mullard as Cafe Boss 
 Ronnie Stevens as 1st Waiter 
 John Clive as Sweeney Todd Manager
 Mike Lennox as Disc Jockey  
 Sydney Bromley as Tramp
 David Lodge as The Caretaker 
 Amy Dalby as Old lady whose house is demolished
 Murray Melvin as 1st Exquisite 
 Bruce Lacey as Clive Sword 
 Cardew Robinson as Custard-Pie Vicar
 Tomorrow as The Snarks
 Paul Danquah as 2nd Exquisite
 Michael Ward as Elderly Shop Owner
 Sam Kydd as Workman in greasy spoon cafe
 Geoffrey Hughes as Workman in greasy spoon cafe
 Jerold Wells as Workman
 Veronica Carlson as Actress at Party
 Valerie Leon as Tove's Secretary

Production
The film reunited Redgrave, Tushingham, composer John Addison, cinematographer Manny Wynn and director Davis (he was also a camera operator in A Taste of Honey) from the 1964 film Girl with Green Eyes. Similarly, Murray Melvin and Paul Danquah, Tushingham's co-stars in A Taste of Honey, appear in cameo roles as boutique shop customers. Geoffrey Hughes, later to become familiar to millions as Eddie Yeats in Coronation Street, appears as a workman. The popular BBC series Juke Box Jury is parodied as Hi-Fi Court, and the UK version of the hidden camera series Candid Camera is parodied as You Can't Help Laughing!

Private Eye magazine at the time referred to the Queen and Princess Margaret as, respectively, Brenda and Yvonne. Some of the characters' names are borrowed from Lewis Carroll's poetry, chiefly the nonsense poem Jabberwocky: Charlotte Brillig, Tom Wabe, Mrs Gimble, Bobby Mome-Rath, Jeremy Tove, Toni Mimsy, and The Snarks (the rock band played by Tomorrow (known at the time of shooting as The In Crowd), including guitarist Steve Howe, later to be a member of Yes, who shouts "Let's do it!"). The futuristic art exhibition is held at the Jabberwock Gallery. The film was nominated for a Golden Globe (Best English-Language Foreign Film) in 1968. The theme tune was sung by Tushingham and Redgrave, who also performed several of the numbers in the film. In the 1993 BBC series Hollywood UK, about the British film industry in the 1960s, the actresses appeared in the back of a London taxi singing the theme again.

Reception
The film performed poorly at the box office and ABC recorded a loss of $710,000. The film critic Alexander Walker noted that the film arrived too late to parody 'Swinging London' as the fad was already dead.

References

External links
 

1967 films
1967 comedy films
ABC Motion Pictures films
British comedy films
British satirical films
Films directed by Desmond Davis
Films scored by John Addison
Films set in London
Films shot in London
Paramount Pictures films
1960s English-language films
1960s British films